Elizabeth McKenzie is an American author and editor. Her work has been featured in The New Yorker, The Atlantic Monthly, Best American Nonrequired Reading. She has received a Pushcart Prize, and her work has been recorded for NPR’s Selected Shorts.

Bibliography

Novels 
 Stop That Girl (2005) nominated for The Story Prize.
 MacGregor Tells the World (2007) was named a San Francisco Chronicle, Chicago Tribune, and Library Journal's Best Book of the year. 
 The Portable Veblen (2016) was longlisted for the National Book Award, won the California Book Award Silver Medal in Fiction, and was shortlisted for the Bayley's Women's Prize.
 The Dog of the North (2023).

Short fiction 

Stories

Editorial career

McKenzie started as a staff editor at the Atlantic Monthly. She is managing editor and fiction editor for the Catamaran Literary Reader, and the senior editor of the Chicago Quarterly Review.

References

External links
 Conspicuous Rambunction: Jennifer Bannan interviews Elizabeth McKenzie

Living people
American women novelists
The New Yorker people
University of California, Santa Cruz alumni
Stanford University alumni
21st-century American novelists
21st-century American women writers
Year of birth missing (living people)